The Bristles is a raw punk band formed in 1982 in Landskrona, Sweden. The name comes from GBH 12-inch Leather, Bristles, Studs and Acne.

The band formed in the beginning of the second wave of punk, influenced by bands like The Exploited and developed from punk with Oi!-influences to a raw punk band (in Swedish, råpunk).
Together with Swedish bands like Asta Kask, Sötlimpa, Existenz, Moderat Likvidation, Noncens, EATER, Anti Cimex and many others the Bristles were the new breed of fast playing bands that released mostly singles, and did a lot of gigging. The band broke up in 1985.

The band briefly reunited in 1996, and later in 2008. In 2009 the EP Union Bashing State was out. In 2010 the album Reflections of the Bourgeois Society is released. It contains 11 tracks. In 2012, the band's second album, Bigger than Punk, was released. In 2014 the tape "Val?" is released. In 2015, the band's third album, Last Days of Capitalism was released. In 2017 a split 7-inch single was out with Rövsvett. In 2019 the EP "Live at Insikten, Kulturhuset Jönköping 20180901" was out.

History

Early days (1982–1985)
The Bristles formed in 1982, influenced by the second punk wave with bands like The Exploited and the Oi!-movement. From the beginning, it was a five piece band. Svegis-Guitar, Nelle-guitar, Rotcher-bass, Lankan-drums, and Viking-vocals. Nelle left the band early to form D.T.A.L. Rotcher left after the Don’t Give Up EP was recorded. He was replaced by Ingemar. The Don't Give Up EP was released in the beginning of 1983.

Soon after the release of the Don't Give Up EP, Viking had to leave the band. He was replaced by Puma from Black Uniforms who had split up a couple of months before.
The band now took another musical direction, dropping the Oi!-influences in favour for merely raw punk.

In the fall of 1983, the Ban the Punk Shops tape was released. It contained mostly old songs re-recorded with Puma on vocals. In the summer of 1984 the band broke up just to shortly after reform with a new drummer, Groll, replacing Lankan. During this period, the Boys will be Boys EP was released. Lankan now joined D.T.A.L.

In 1984 the band appeared on the Welcome to 1984-compilation Maximumrocknroll with the song Don't Give Up. The record made the band known around the world.

The band recorded four new songs in Stockholm in 1985 that were supposed to be a new EP released by Rosa Honung Records. Instead the band broke up again due to musical differences fuelled with drug issues. The band had said that the argument of musical direction was typical at the time, when the second punk wave was dying, and some wanted to play harder and others wanted to play more punk rock a la 77.

Briefly reunited (1996)
The band briefly reunited in 1996 to play at Bollnäs-punken. Malwin from Svegis' band The Skalatones played drums. A permanent reunion weren't possible cos' of Svegis and Malvins engagement in the Skalatones.

Reunion (2008–present)

The Bristles reformed after the making of the compilation No Future in the Past.

Harri from Svegis' band The Negatives became the new drummer. In 2009 the Union Bashing State CD EP is released. Soon after Harri left the band. He was replaced by Ray (DTAL, Hyste'riah G.B.C, Driller Killer), a friend of the band since the early days.

In 2010 the album Reflections of the Bourgeois Society is released. It contains 11 tracks. On the record there are guest artists as Emilush, Neli from Hoogans Hjältar, and Jyrki from the Negatives. The record is produced by Klas Ideberg from Darkane. The album theme is the latest capitalist crises.

In 2011 the band releases Beväpna er/Were only in it for the drugs no. 2, two songs of the Swedish band Ebba Grön. According to the press release, it was "a fuck off to the Swedish right wing government", as a digital single. Shortly thereafter it's also released on vinyl 7”. The release included a paper describing the political rights first four years in power in Sweden, 2006-2010, exposing the politics of benefit the wealthy at the expense of less well-off.

In 2012 the album Bigger Than Punk is released. The album contains 11 tracks. The album title is borrowed from Dead Prez, but concerning punk. The album is produced by Tommy Tift (Sista Sekunden, Vånna Inget). The topics of the lyrics concern more every day life than on the album before.

In 2013 the Schlagers
Christmas single from 1980 is covered - Each artist with self-respect is
recording Christmas songs. Stevie Wonder, Bob Dylan, Lynyrd Skynyrd, who has
released two, to name a few. It’s Bristles versions of music magazine Schlagers
Christmas single from 1980, Anders F Rönnbloms Det är inte snön som faller
(It's Not Snow That's Falling) and Ebba Gröns Nu slocknar tusen människoliv
(Now Thousand Lives Fades Away).
- We thought it was appropriate to bring a different perspective on this feast,
says Svegis, the band's guitarist. The pc-critical perspective which, although
obvious, drowns in the peddlers praise to consumerism.
- We choose the songs we cover with great care. Last time we did the Swedish
National Anthem, Ebba Gröns Beväpna er (Arm Yourself). So when we discussed
Christmas songs the songs on Schlagers Christmas record from 1980, Anders F
Rönnbloms Det är inte snön som faller och Ebba Gröns Nu släckas tusen människoliv,
became natural choices. They're both classic Christmas songs. Only out on
digital platforms.

In 2014 the EP Val? On Tape - in English Election/Choice? - released to the
upcoming Swedish election, and the lyrics are completely in Swedish. The songs
are recorded in one take, and no overdubs.  The band has no illusion about
a labour government, but the last 8 years of Right wing rule has been a
disaster. The Right wing got re-elected at the same time as a fascist party got
in the parliament.  The recording and production is completely done by Tommy Tift (Sista Sekunden, Vånna Inget) and released on his Majken Records.

In 2015 (November) The Bristles new album Last Days of Capitalism is out and it
is a review of the past two years' events ending up in the current both
economic and political crisis. The economic crisis has led to war, and the
political crisis consists of the fascism it brought. Racism and chauvinism are
now norm. 
Other topics covered are the West's mass consumption, men's global war on women,
the Left's failure, and multinational companies grip on people. Then there are
some more traditional working-class songs about work buyers reprimands and
neglecting ones job for the last time.
Musically it follows the frustration over the state of affairs. It's fast,
hard, simple and crude. There are no false notes, it's not out of tune,
no-one's playing anything wrong, although it may appear so, it's exactly the
way it's supposed to be.

Late 2015 the ex-singer from Moderat Likvidation in the 80's Tobbe join the band.

Late 2016 Puma left the band and Tobbe from Moderat Likvidation is the singer in the band.

In 2018 the band got Pascal in so they have now two singers. The split single with Rövsvett is released.

In Sep. 27 2019 the single Stukad is out.

Members
Current members
 Svegis – guitar (1982–1985, 1996, 2008–present)
 Ingemar – bass (1982–1985, 1996, 2008–present)
 Tobbe - voice (2015–present (Moderat Likvidation in the 80's)
 Ray – drums (2009–present)
 Pascal – voice (2018–present)

Former members
 Nelle – guitar (1982)
 Rotcher – bass (1982)
 Viking - vocals (1982)
 Lankan – drums (1982–1984)
 Groll – drums (1984–1985)
 Malwin – drums (1996)
 Harri – drums (2008-2009)
 Puma – voice (1982–1985, 1996, 2008–2016)

Discography
 Don't Give Up 7-inch EP (Bristles Punx and Skins Records, 1983)
 Ban the Punk Shops Tape (Ägg Tapes, 1983)
 Boys will be Boys 7-inch EP (Rockin Rebels Records, 1984)
 Ban the Punk Shops Tape re-issue (Jungle Hop International, 1985)
 Union Bashing State CD EP (MCR, 2009)
 Reflections of the Bourgeois Society CD/LP (Switchlight Records, Anarkopunx, Noise of Sweden, 2010)
 Beväpna er/We're only in it for the drugs no. 2 Digi/7" single (Bristles Records/Hot Stuff, 2011)
 Bigger than Punk CD/LP (Switchlight Records, Turist i Tillvaron, Noise of Sweden, Heptown Records, 2012)
 Schlagers Christmas single DIGITAL (Bristles Records, 2013)
 Val?  EP Tape (Majken Records, 2014) 
 Ban the Punk Shops Tape re-issue (Aftermath Tapes, 2015)
  Last Days Of Capitalism CD/LP, (Heptown Records, Civilisation Records, Pike Records, 2015)
  Split Single with Rövsvett (Heptown Records, Just 4 For Fun, Civilisation Records, Pike RecordsEP 2018)
  Live at Insikten, Kulturhuset Jönköping 20180901 (Bristles Records EP 2019)
  Stukad (Bristles Records Single 2019)

Compilations
 No Future in the Past (the best and the rest) 2CD's + DVD (MCR, 2008)
 No Future in the Past (the best and the rest) Part 1 LP (Noise & Distortion, 2008)

Other appearances
 Welcome to 1984 LP (Maximumrocknroll 1984) "Don't Give Up"
 Really Fast Vol. 2 LP (Really Fast Records 1985) "Nowhere"
 We don't need your nuclear force LP (Mülleimer Records 1986) "War Heroes", "1984 Part II"
 Varning för punk 3CD's (Distortion Records 1994) "Bristles Song", "Sick"
 Really Fast 1-3 2CD's (Really Fast Records 2000) "Nowhere"
 Svenska Punkklassiker Vol. 2" CD (MNW 2007) “Don’t Give Up”
 Landskrona CD 2007 "Landskrona Song"
 Dimmorna skingras vol 2 LP (Pike Records 2012) "Checkpoint Sweden", "A Prayer for the Employer"
 Dimmorna skingras vol4 LP

Bibliography
 Ny Våg - Svensk Punk/New Wave/Synth 1977-1982 by Peter Kagerland (2012)
 The encyclopedia of Swedish punk 1977-1987 by Peter Jandreus (2008)

References

External links

 The Bristles Web site
 The Bristles Facebook
 Video channel – See all The Bristles videos
 Skrutt - Interview with Svegis 2008
 Schizo Interview – The Bristles interview from 2012
 HD Interview – The Bristles interview in the Swedish newspaper HD 2012

Swedish punk rock groups
Musical groups established in 1982
People from Landskrona Municipality
1982 establishments in Sweden